The 2018 German Masters (officially the 2018 D88 German Masters) was a professional ranking snooker tournament, that took place from 31 January to 4 February 2018 in Berlin, Germany. It was the thirteenth ranking event of the 2017/2018 season.

Anthony Hamilton was the defending champion, but he lost 1–5 to Jimmy Robertson in the first round.

Mark Williams won his 20th professional ranking title and his second of the season, defeating Graeme Dott 9–1 in the final.

Prize fund
The breakdown of prize money for this year is shown below:

 Winner: £80,000
 Runner-up: £35,000
 Semi-final: £20,000
 Quarter-final: £10,000
 Last 16: £5,000
 Last 32: £4,000
 Last 64: £2,000

 Highest break: £1,500
 Total: £364,500

The "rolling 147 prize" for a maximum break stood at £5,000.

Main draw

Final

Qualifying
These matches were played between 19 and 22 December 2017 at the Barnsley Metrodome in Barnsley, England. All matches were best of 9 frames. Ali Carter was a 2017 German Masters finalist, but he was beaten 5–3 by Wang Yuchen.

Round 1

Round 2

Century breaks

Televised stage centuries

Total: 27

 140, 109, 103  Judd Trump
 138, 104  Shaun Murphy
 136  Mark Joyce
 136  Mei Xiwen
 131, 124  Ding Junhui
 130, 117, 115  Ryan Day
 121  Graeme Dott
 114, 104  Ben Woollaston
 112, 108  Gary Wilson
 111  Liang Wenbo
 110, 109  Mark Williams
 109, 103  Mark Davis
 103  Jack Lisowski
 102  Ricky Walden
 101  David Gilbert
 101  Matthew Selt
 100  Mark Allen

Qualifying stage centuries

Total: 52

 140  Chen Zifan
 138  Christopher Keogan
 135  Alfie Burden
 132, 131, 113, 106  Jimmy Robertson
 130, 120, 113  Mark Allen
 129  Michael White
 126  Zhang Anda
 125, 121  Robin Hull
 125, 109  Niu Zhuang
 124  Andrew Higginson
 123  Cao Yupeng
 123  Yu Delu
 122, 121  Rory McLeod
 122  Xiao Guodong
 121, 106  Thepchaiya Un-Nooh
 121  Stuart Carrington
 121  Sam Craigie
 120  Mark Joyce
 119, 115  Mark Selby

 119  Liam Highfield
 119  Michael Holt
 119  Daniel Wells
 116  Michael Georgiou
 116  Zhao Xintong
 114, 109, 108, 102  Judd Trump
 113  Barry Hawkins
 112, 100  Matthew Stevens
 110  Mark Davis
 105  David Gilbert
 105  Jamie Jones
 105  Robert Milkins
 104  David Grace
 104  Jackson Page
 103  Fergal O'Brien
 101  Neil Robertson
 101  Soheil Vahedi
 101  Yuan Sijun
 100  Liang Wenbo

References

2018
German Masters
Masters
German Masters
German Masters
Sports competitions in Berlin